Ōoku is a section of Edo Castle, Japan.

Ōoku may also refer to:

 Ōoku (2003 TV series), a Japanese TV series
 Ōoku (1983 TV series), a Japanese television series
 Oh! Oku, a 2006 film based on the TV series
 Ooku (album), a 2008 album by Masami Okui
 Ōoku: The Inner Chambers, a 2005 manga series by Fumi Yoshinaga